Cherokee flag may refer to any of several flags associated with groups within the Cherokee Native American tribe. These include

 the Flag of the Cherokee Nation (Oklahoma)
 the Flag of the United Keetoowah Band of Cherokee Indians (Oklahoma)
 the Flag of the Eastern Band of the Cherokee nation (North Carolina).